William Carlin (1829–1903), was a US Civil War General.

William Carlin may also refer to:

 William Carlin (footballer) (born 1940), English football player

See also
 Will Carling, English rugby player
 Carlin (disambiguation)